American Inquisition is the thirteenth studio album by the band Christian Death. The album was released on Season of Mist on October 15, 2007, worldwide, and on October 23, 2007, in USA and Canada in an exclusive digipak complete with embossing and spot lacquering. The catalogue number is SOM166.

It was previously thought that the next Christian Death album would be called Ten Excuses for Suicide as announced on the official site back in 2003, but this has proved not to be the case.

Track listing 
 "Water into Wine" – 5:54
 "Stop Bleeding on Me" – 4:00
 "Narcissus Metamorphosis Of" – 5:38
 "Victim X" – 5:50
 "To Disappear" – 4:23
 "Dexter Said No to Methadone" – 4:18
 "Angels and Drugs" – 4:57
 "Seduction Thy Destruction" – 5:06
 "Worship Along the Nile" – 4:17
 "See You in Hell" – 5:08
 "Surviving Armageddon" – 5:34
 "Last Thing" – 4:44
 "XIII" – 9:50

Personnel
Valor Kand - vocals, guitars, acoustic strings, synths, drums, percussion
Maitri - vocals, bass, percussion
Nate Hassan - drums
Tila - acoustic keyboards

Additional musicians
Juan "Punchy" Gonzalez - power guitar on "Stop Bleeding on Me"
Coyote - additional guitar on "Narcissus Metamorphosis Of"
Adeline Bellart - French monologue

References 

2007 albums
Christian Death albums
Season of Mist albums